TU Dresden (for , abbreviated as TUD and often wrongly translated as "Dresden University of Technology") is a public research university, the largest institute of higher education in the city of Dresden, the largest university in Saxony and one of the 10 largest universities in Germany with 32,389 students .

The name Technische Universität Dresden has only been used since 1961; the history of the university, however, goes back nearly 200 years to 1828. This makes it one of the oldest colleges of technology in Germany, and one of the country's oldest universities, which in German today refers to institutes of higher education that cover the entire curriculum. The university is a member of TU9, a consortium of the nine leading German Institutes of Technology. The university is one of eleven German universities which succeeded in the Excellence Initiative in 2012, thus getting the title of a "University of Excellence". The TU Dresden succeeded in all three rounds of the German Universities Excellence Initiative (Future Concept, Graduate Schools, Clusters of Excellence).

History
In 1828, with emerging industrialization, the Saxon Technical School was founded to educate skilled workers in technological subjects such as mechanics, mechanical engineering and ship construction. In 1871, the year the German Empire was founded, the institute was renamed the Royal Saxon Polytechnic Institute. At that time, subjects not connected with technology, such as history and languages, were introduced. By the end of the 19th century the institute had developed into a university covering all disciplines. In 1961 it was given its present name,  (TU Dresden).

Upon German reunification in 1990, the university had already integrated the College of Forestry, formerly the Royal Saxony Academy of Forestry, in the nearby small town of Tharandt. This was followed by the integration of the Dresden College of Engineering, the Friedrich List College of Transport the faculty of transport science, and the "Carl-Gustav Carus" Medical Academy ( or MedAk for short), the medical faculty. Some faculties were newly founded: the faculties of Information Technology (1991), Law (1991), Education (1993) and Economics (1993).

In 2009 TU Dresden, all Dresden institutes of the Fraunhofer Society, the Gottfried Wilhelm Leibniz Scientific Community and the Max Planck Society and Forschungszentrum Dresden-Rossendorf, soon incorporated into the Helmholtz Association of German Research Centres, published a joint letter of intent with the name  – Dresden Research and Education Synergies for the Development of Excellence and Novelty, which points out worldwide elite aspirations, which was recognized as the first time that all four big post-gradual elite institutions declared campus co-operation with a university.

Campus

TU Dresden is a campus university in most aspects. Some of its buildings are more than a hundred years old (such as the buildings around Muenchner Platz square). The architecture of these buildings is mostly influenced by the art nouveau style or the Bauhaus school (e.g. the chemistry building ). In recent years these historic buildings have been complemented by modern buildings (e.g. the library, the main auditorium, the biochemistry department or the life sciences building).

The main campus, as well as the medical faculty and that of computer science, are all within the boundaries of the city of Dresden. The main campus is located south of the city center, mostly in the area bordered by Nöthnitzer Straße, Fritz-Förster-Platz and Münchner Platz; the medical faculty can be found in the Johannstadt district. The faculty of forestry, formerly the Royal Saxon Academy of Forestry, resides in a forest area in the nearby town of Tharandt.

Organization
TU Dresden has 14 faculties. Almost all faculties are located on the main campus south of the city center, except for the Faculty of Medicine that has its own campus near the Elbe river East of the city center and the Department of Forestry in Tharandt.

Sciences
With 4,390 students the Faculty of Mathematics and the Natural Sciences is the second-largest faculty at the university. It is composed of five departments: Biology, Chemistry, Mathematics, Physics and Psychology. The departments are all located on the main campus. In 2006, a new research building for the biology department opened. In October 2006 the Deutsche Forschungsgemeinschaft decided to fund a new graduate school, the Dresden International Graduate School for Biomedicine and Bioengineering and a so-called cluster of excellence From Cells to Tissues to Therapies.

Engineering

 The Faculty of Architecture comprises six departments. Currently, there are 1,410 students enrolled.
 The Faculty of Civil Engineering is structured into eleven departments. It is the oldest and smallest of the faculties. There are currently 800 students enrolled.
 The Faculty of Computer Science comprises six departments: Applied Computer Science, Artificial Intelligence, Software- and Multimedia-Technology, Systems Architecture, Computer Engineering and Theoretical Computer Science. The faculty has 2,703 students.
 The Faculty of Electrical Engineering and Information Technology is organized into 13 departments. There are 2,288 students enrolled. The faculty is the heart of the so-called Silicon Saxony in Dresden.
 The Faculty of Environmental Sciences has 2,914 students. The faculty is located on the main campus, except for the Forestry department which is located in Tharandt. The Forestry department is the oldest of its kind in Germany. Its history goes back to the foundation of the Royal Saxon Academy of Forestry in 1816.
 The Faculty of Mechanical Engineering comprises 19 departments and has 5,731 students. It is the largest faculty at TUD.
 The Faculty of Transport and Traffic Sciences "Friedrich List" is the only of its kind in Germany covering transport and traffic from economy and system theory science to electrical, civil and mechanical engineering. There are 1,536 students enrolled.

Humanities and Social Sciences
 The Faculty of Business and Economics comprises five departments: Business Education Studies, Business Management, Economics, Business Information Systems and Statistics. There are 2,842 students enrolled.
 The Faculty of Education, located east of the main campus, has 2,075 students.
 The Faculty of Languages, Literature and Culture is structured into five departments: American Studies, English Studies, German Studies, Philology, Romance Languages and Slavic Studies. There are 3,215 students at this faculty.
 The Faculty of Law is going to close in the next few years. Currently there are still 933 students enrolled. The TU Dresden has partially compensated for the closure by establishing a private law school.
 The Faculty of Philosophy comprises seven departments: Art History, Communications, History, Musicology, Political Sciences, Sociology and Theology. There are 3,485 students enrolled.
 The School of International Studies is a so-called central institution of the university coordinating the law, economics and political sciences departments for courses of interdisciplinary international relations.

Medicine
 The Carl Gustav Carus Faculty of Medicine has its own campus east of the city center near the Elbe river. Currently, there are 2,195 students enrolled. The faculty has a partnership with Partners Harvard Medical International.

Research Centers
 Center for Advancing Electronics Dresden (cfaed) – Cluster of Excellence
  – Cluster of Excellence
 Dendro-Institute Tharandt at the TU Dresden
 The European Institute for Postgraduate Education at TU Dresden
 The European Institute of Transport
 The Hannah Arendt Center for Research on Totalitarianism
 Center for Media Culture
 Center for Research on Mechanics of Structures and Materials
 TUD Vietnam ERC, the TU Dresden Vietnam Education and Research Center. The center offers a Master's course in Mechatronics in Hanoi, Vietnam, since 2004.
 Center for Continuing Education in Historic Preservation
 School of International Studies

Research
The TU Dresden benefits from the strong research tradition in microelectronics and transport sciences in the Dresden area, but also from the establishment of new research fields such as Biotechnology.

Biotechnology and medical technology
The university has established a strong partnership with the Max Planck Institute for Molecular Cell Biology and Genetics in molecular bioengineering. As part of the German Universities Excellence Initiative, the Deutsche Forschungsgemeinschaft has decided to fund the Cluster of Excellence "From Cells to Tissues to Therapies: Engineering the Cellular Basis of Regeneration" (now ), as well as a new graduate school, the "Dresden International Graduate School for Biomedicine and Bioengineering" with about 300 PhD students. 

The CRTD together with the Biotechnology Center (BIOTEC) and the Center for Molecular Bioengineering (B CUBE) are part of the Center for Molecular and Cellular Bioengineering (CMCB) as central scientific unit of the TU Dresden.
The Biotechnology Center (BIOTEC) is a unique interdisciplinary center focusing on research and teaching in molecular bioengineering. It hosts top international research groups dedicated to genomics, proteomics, biophysics, cellular machines, tissue engineering, and bioinformatics. The research at the CRTD and BIOTEC is complemented by that of the B CUBE which aims to learn from nature and translate the new knowledge into technological applications.

Magnetism and material sciences
The Deutsche Forschungsgemeinschaft funds research in the area of electromagnetic flow influence in metallurgy, artificial crystal formation and electrochemistry. Other research is done on the Meissner effect and artificial fibers (textile).

Micro and nanotechnology
Silicon Saxony is the biggest cluster of the microelectronics industries in Europe. TU Dresden is incorporated in this network with three departments of the faculties of Electrical Engineering and Sciences. Together with the Fraunhofer Center for Nano-electronic technologies (CNT), it represents one of the leading universities in the field of nanotechnology. There is also a research cooperation with some semiconductor fields of TU Freiberg. In May 2012 the Helmholtz-Kolleg NANONET was founded.

Transport
The university has a partnership with the Fraunhofer-Institut for Transport and Infrastructure systems to research on IT-systems for public transport in Dresden.

Business and Economics
In partnership with TU Dresden, the Ifo Institute of Economic Research is researching the economic development in Eastern Germany.

The university belongs to a consortium of European Universities offering the Erasmus Mundus Joint Doctoral Programme IT4BI-DC for Business Intelligence.

Other research areas
The Deutsche Forschungsgemeinschaft supports the university in many areas and TU Dresden cooperates closely with renowned research institutes such as Fraunhofer Society, Gottfried Wilhelm Leibniz Scientific Community and Max Planck Society.

Neuromorphic computing facility

TU Dresden received a grant of eight million euro from the EU's Human Brain Project to build the second generation spinnaker computer called spincloud.

Reputation

According to the QS Engineering and Technology Ranking the university ranked 113th worldwide and 5th in Germany. According to the Times Higher Education World University Rankings the university ranked 157th worldwide and in engineering & technology the university ranked 90th worldwide. Moreover, According to Reuters, the university was ranked 79th in the list of 'Most Innovative Universities Ranking 2019'. 

The Eduniversal Business Schools ranking ranks the university's Faculty of Business and Economics with 3 out of 5 palmes of excellence. According to the university ranking 2016 of the German business magazine Wirtschaftswoche the university ranked 7th in Germany in computer science and mechanical engineering and 6th in Germany in business informatics and engineering management. The university did not take first place in any of the ranked subjects: Business Administration, Business informatics, Engineering management, Natural Sciences, Computer Science, Electrical Engineering, Mechanical Engineering and Economics.

International cooperations
As one of the first universities in Germany it has opened a branch in Hanoi, Vietnam offering a Master's course in mechatronics. It also maintains close partnerships with leading universities around the world, e.g. Boston University, Georgetown University, Harvard Medical School, Tongji University and POSTECH.

Student life

General
Of the roughly 35,000 students, 45% are studying Engineering Sciences, 36.2% Humanities and Social Sciences, 12.5% Natural Sciences and Mathematics and 6.3% Medicine.

About 59% (20,620) of the student body originates from Saxony, 18.9% (6,626) from other Eastern German federal states, 12.3% (4,306) from the Western German federal states and 9.8% (3,442) from other countries.

Of the 20,620 students from Saxony, 12,351 (59.9%) are from Dresden, 2,934 (14.2%) from the Dresden metro area and 5,335 (25.9%) from other parts of Saxony.

The origin of the students is based on the location where the A-level exams have been completed.

International students
There are 3,442 international students enrolled at the TU Dresden (2005–2006). Most of the foreign students come from Europe (1,527), followed by Asia (1,404) and America (170). Ranked by countries the largest group of students comes from China (710), followed by Poland (294), Vietnam (196), Bulgaria (160) and Russia (154). The university is also quite popular among Central and East European countries such as the neighboring Czech Republic or Ukraine. Also, through the Erasmus programme and partnerships with universities in the USA, there are many English-, French- and Spanish-speaking students. The language spoken during lessons is nearly always German on most faculties. To prepare for admissions to the university, many foreign students attend German language courses at the university-affiliated language school .

International students interested in TU Dresden should visit the websites of the Akademisches Auslandsamt (International office) for more information. This office is responsible for handling international applications. At the end of 2011, 13.7% of beginning students came from abroad.

A number of activities for international students facilitates their integration and help students to find new friends. Most notably the Erasmus-Initiative TU Dresden offers many group activities throughout the semester which are open to all students (not only to Erasmus participants). A student-run program, the LinkPartnerProgramm matches every interested international student with a German student, to help him or her with questions arising during the first weeks, be it regarding course registration or any other issue students might have.

Leisure activities
Sports are very popular among the TUD students. There are eight big students' clubs and the summer campus party is considered to be the biggest in Germany. There are cafeterias as at most universities and the largest refectory can compete with some restaurants even as far as menu size.

Performing arts ensembles
Among the many groups at the TU Dresden are four major ensembles. These four include the theater group  which has a small ensemble directed by professionals, and the folk dance group  which is dedicated to reviving regional styles of dance. The last two groups are the largest by far and these are the university choir and the university orchestra, both having student and non-student members of all ages. Each of these major ensembles performs an average of one to four times per semester. These performances often take place in Saxony but also occasionally internationally.

Funding
The university is currently developing new strategies to make itself more independent from state funding and decision making. With regard to its ability to generate research money from industry partners, the TU Dresden belongs to the most successful in Germany. In 2004 3,564 projects were financed with 104.1 million Euro from outside sources (other than state funds). It has one of the highest shares of income by industry partnerships.

Points of interest
 Botanischer Garten der Technischen Universität Dresden, the university's botanical garden
 Forstbotanischer Garten Tharandt, the university's historic arboretum
  Archives of the university

Notable people

Honorary doctors
 1905 Wilhelm von Siemens – Industrialist
 1906 Ferdinand von Zeppelin – Lieutenant general and airship pioneer
 1928 Heinrich Rickert – Philosopher
1928 Fredrik Ljungström – Engineer, inventor
 1981 Konrad Zuse – Civil engineer and computer scientist who built the world's first programmable computer
 1987 Karl Reinisch – Engineer
 1989 Kurt A. Körber – Entrepreneur who founded Körber Group
 1990 Günther Landgraf – Physicist, rector of TU Dresden from 1990 to 1994
 1995 Václav Havel – Writer, dissident and first president of the Czech Republic
 1999 Kofi Annan – Former United Nations Secretary-General
 2002 Walter Kohn – Physicist, recipient of the 1998 Nobel Prize in Chemistry

Honorary senators
 1997 Günther Landgraf – Rector of TU Dresden 1990–1994
 2000 Günter Blobel – Recipient of the 1999 Nobel Prize in Physiology or Medicine

Faculty
 Manfred von Ardenne – Physics
 Heinrich Barkhausen 1911–1953 (not continuously) – Communications technology. Discoverer of the Barkhausen jumps, a manifestation of domain wall movement in magnets.
 Alfred Baeumler 1924–1933 – Nazi-philosopher and educationalist
 Kurt Beyer – Civil engineering
 Manfred Buchroithner — Cartography
 Adolf Busemann – Aerodynamics
 Carl Gustav Carus – Medicine
 Gerhard Fettweis – Engineering
 Klaus Fuchs – Nuclear technology, soviet spy
 Hanns Bruno Geinitz – Geology
 Gustav Kafka 1923–1934 – Psychology
 Victor Klemperer 1920–1935 – Professor for romance studies; He wrote "LTI", an analysis of the Nazi's language, and detailed dairies during the Nazi time.
 Richard Kroner 1924–1928 – Philosopher (Religion)
 Luise Krüger – Athlete
 Günther Landgraf – Physics, first freely elected rector of TUD
 Nikolaus Joachim Lehmann 1921–1998 – Mathematician, professor, first lectures in informatics in the GDR 1967
 Wilhelm Gotthelf Lohrmann – Astronomer, Geodete
 Richard von Mises – Mathematician, Professor for Hydro- und Aerodynamics
 Maria Reiche – (1903–1988) – mathematician, archaeologist, and technical translator has studied in this University.
 Roland Scholl 1918–1934 – Chemist; director of the institute for organic chemistry
 Wilhelm Steinkopf 1919–1940 – Chemist
 Paul Tillich 1925–1929 – Philosopher (Religion)
 Gustav Zeuner – Engineer

Alumni
 Afroz Ahmad
 Carl Theodor Albrecht – Surveyor
 Fritz Bleyl – (Architecture) Architect and painter of expressionism
 Kwong-Chai Chu (朱光彩) – Chinese hydraulic engineer who received his CIE (Chinese Institute of Engineers) Award in 1947
 Carl Enckell – (Mechanical Engineering) Finnish politician
 Erik von Frenckell – (Engineering) a sports administrator, member of IOC and vice president of FIFA
 Steffen Heidrich – (Business Management) Former footballer
 Rudolph Hering – (Civil Engineering)
 Katja Kipping – Chairwoman of German Left Party
 Max Littmann – (Civil engineering) Architect
 Reimund Neugebauer – (Mechanical Engineering) Designated President of Fraunhofer Society
 Theodor Pallady – Romanian painter
 Evgeny Paton – (Engineering) Ukrainian
 Ernst Otto Schlick – (Engineering) Shipbuilding engineer
 Herbert Seifert – Mathematician
 Johannes Paul Thilman – (Science of Culture) Composer
 Stanislaw Tillich – (Mechanical Engineering) Minister-President of Saxony

References

External links

 

 
Technical universities and colleges in Germany
Educational institutions established in 1828
Engineering universities and colleges in Germany
Art Nouveau architecture in Germany
Art Nouveau educational buildings
1828 establishments in Saxony
Universities and colleges in Saxony